Dato' Kamarul Baharin bin Abbas (born 12 June 1947) is a Malaysian politician and the Member of the Parliament of Malaysia for the Telok Kemang constituency in the state of Negeri Sembilan for two terms from 2008 to 2018. He is a member of the People's Justice Party (PKR), a component party in the Pakatan Harapan (PH)  coalition.

Kamarul was first elected to Parliament in the 2008 general election winning the seat of Telok Kemang. In doing so he unseated the incumbent member Sothinathan Sinna Gounder from the then still governing Barisan Nasional (BN) coalition. He was re-elected in 2013 general election. Kamarul was state chief of PKR for both the 2008 and 2013 elections. He did not contest in the 2018 general election when the Telok Kemang constituency was abolished and renamed as Port Dickson.

Election results

Honours
 :
 Knight Companion of the Order of Sultan Salahuddin Abdul Aziz Shah (DSSA) – Dato' (1996)

See also

Telok Kemang (federal constituency)

References

Living people
1947 births
People from Perak
Malaysian people of Malay descent
Malaysian Muslims
People's Justice Party (Malaysia) politicians
Members of the Dewan Rakyat
21st-century Malaysian politicians